WWMP (103.3 FM, "Rock 103.3") is a radio station broadcasting an active rock format that is licensed to Waterbury, Vermont, United States. The station serves the Burlington-Plattsburgh area.  The station is owned by Radio Broadcasting Services, Inc.

In 2011, WWMP was granted a U.S. Federal Communications Commission construction permit to move to a new transmitter site, decrease ERP to 1,050 watts, increase HAAT to 806 meters and change to a directional antenna.

History
The station was assigned the callsign WVRS on March 24, 1983. On March 1, 1984, the station changed its callsign to WTIJ; on May 31, 1986 to WGLY-FM; on July 9, 1999 to WDOT; on September 28, 1999 to WLKC (with an adult contemporary format that caused WEZF switching to hot adult contemporary, only for WEZF to switch back to AC in 2003); and on June 13, 2005 to WWMP.

The station began with a predominantly religious format, airing blocks of Christian talk programs and music. The WTIJ callsign stood for, "We Trust In Jesus." With a callsign change to WGLY-FM, which stood for, "With Gods Love to You."  The station became an affiliate of Moody Radio airing a format of Christian music, lecture, campus chapel, listener-interactive talk, and devotionals. The religious format was flipped to WCMK 91.5 in Bolton, Vermont—which also took the WGLY-FM callsign—when the station was purchased by Radio Broadcast Services Inc. in 1999.

After four years as an adult hits station, the station reverted to its old hot AC format, which the station dropped during the "Alice" days under the old WXAL & WLKC calls.  As MP103.3, WWMP aired an "adult hits" format. With its "MP 103" branding and no on-air DJs, the station patterned itself as an over-the-air MP3 player.

In 2018, WWMP rebranded as "Free 103.3" with no change in format.

On October 17, 2019, WWMP changed their format from adult hits to mainstream rock, branded as "Rock 103.3".

Translator

Booster

References

External links

FCC construction permit

WMP
Radio stations established in 1983
1983 establishments in Vermont
Mainstream rock radio stations in the United States
Active rock radio stations in the United States